Folkman's theorem is a theorem in mathematics, and more particularly in arithmetic combinatorics and Ramsey theory. According to this theorem, whenever the natural numbers are partitioned into finitely many subsets, there exist arbitrarily large sets of numbers all of whose sums belong to the same subset of the partition. The theorem had been discovered and proved independently by several mathematicians, before it was named "Folkman's theorem", as a memorial to Jon Folkman, by Graham, Rothschild, and Spencer.

Statement of the theorem
Let N be the set {1, 2, 3, ...} of positive integers, and suppose that N is partitioned into k different subsets N1, N2, ... Nk, where k is any positive integer. Then Folkman's theorem states that, for every positive integer m, there exists a set Sm and an index im such that Sm has m elements and such that every sum of a nonempty subset of Sm belongs to Nim.

Relation to Rado's theorem and Schur's theorem
Schur's theorem in Ramsey theory states that, for any finite partition of the positive integers, there exist three numbers x, y, and x + y that all belong to the same partition set. That is, it is the special case m = 2 of Folkman's theorem.

Rado's theorem in Ramsey theory concerns a similar problem statement in which the integers are partitioned into finitely many subsets; the theorem characterizes the integer matrices A with the property that the system of linear equations  can be guaranteed to have a solution in which every coordinate of the solution vector x belongs to the same subset of the partition. A system of equations is said to be regular whenever it satisfies the conditions of Rado's theorem; Folkman's theorem is equivalent to the regularity of the system of equations

where T ranges over each nonempty subset of the set

Multiplication versus addition
It is possible to replace addition by multiplication in Folkman's theorem: if the natural numbers are finitely partitioned, there exist arbitrarily large sets S such that all products of nonempty subsets of S belong to a single partition set. Indeed, if one restricts S to consist only of powers of two, then this result follows immediately from the additive version of Folkman's theorem. However, it is open whether there exist arbitrarily large sets such that all sums and all products of nonempty subsets belong to a single partition set. The first example of nonlinearity in Ramsey Theory which does not consist of monomials was given, independently, by Furstenberg and  Sarkozy in 1977, with the family }, result which was further improved by Bergelson in 1987. In 2016, J. Moreira proved there exists a set of the form } contained in an element of the partition However it is not even known whether there must necessarily exist a set of the form } for which all four elements belong to the same partition set.

Canonical Folkman Theorem
Let  be a (possibly infinite) coloring of the positive integers, and let  be an arbitrary positive integer. There exists  such that at least one of the following 3 conditions holds.

1)  is a monochromatic set.

2)  is a rainbow set.

Previous results
Variants of Folkman's theorem had been proved by Richard Rado and by J. H. Sanders.  Folkman's theorem was named in memory of Jon Folkman  by Ronald Graham, Bruce Lee Rothschild, and Joel Spencer, in their book on Ramsey theory.

References

Theorems in discrete mathematics
Ramsey theory
Sumsets
Additive combinatorics
Additive number theory
Theorems in combinatorics